2nd Regiment of Horse or 2nd Horse may refer to:

 1st King's Dragoon Guards, ranked as 2nd Horse from 1685 to 1746
 5th Dragoon Guards, ranked as 2nd (Irish) Horse from 1746 to 1788
 2nd King Edward's Horse, active 1914 to 1917